Afrolixa is a genus of flies in the family Tachinidae from Mozambique, Malawi and South Africa. It contains only one species, Afrolixa macula.

Species
Afrolixa macula Curran, 1939

Distribution
Malawi, Mozambique, South Africa.

References

Exoristinae
Diptera of Africa
Tachinidae genera
Monotypic Brachycera genera
Taxa named by Charles Howard Curran